The NSW Schools Spectacular is an Australian variety show featuring more than 5,500 students from public schools across New South Wales and was performed annually at the Sydney Entertainment Centre (later known as Qantas Credit Union Arena) between 1984 and 2015, after which the venue was permanently closed.  In 2016, it moved to Sydney Olympic Park, and found its new home at Qudos Bank Arena.

The Schools Spectacular was broadcast by the Australian Broadcasting Corporation from 1984 until 2012, then by the Nine Network from 2013 until 2015.  The Seven Network has been broadcasting the Schools Spectacular since 2016. Fifteen television cameras are placed in various vantage points throughout the arena.  All four performances are recorded, and the best versions of each show segment are edited together and then aired in the television broadcast two weeks after the live event.

The actual performance is made up of many different pieces. A typical piece would have a spotlighted soloist singing on an elevated platform in the arena, surrounded by many dancers and actors. On the stage, the orchestra would be playing the instrumental part of the song while the choirs behind and next to the orchestra would be singing the chorus of the song.  There are some 400 audio inputs for microphones and musical instruments, and an amazing array of around 600 lights used throughout the show.

The first Schools Spectacular was Schools Spectacular 1983 and was intended to be a sound test for the Sydney Entertainment Centre. Since then, the Schools Spectacular has evolved significantly.  The 2012 event included 3,600 students and 600 teachers from 400 schools in four performances viewed by 30,000 people. Schools Spectacular 2016 broke the Guinness World Record for "Largest Amateur Variety Act", with 5,500 performers.

As well as being broadcast each year on national television, the Schools Spectacular is webcast through the Internet onto their website, with the help and sponsorship by Cisco Systems.  The Schools Spectacular is produced by 'The Arts Unit' of the New South Wales Department of Education.

Themes By Year
Each year the Schools Spectacular follows a theme:

1993 – One Spirit
1994 – International
1995 – Hats Off To Australia
1996 – Get Set 2000
1997 – The Edge
1998 – Reaching the World
1999 – To Be Australian
2000 – The Entertainers
2001 – Celebrate!
2002 – By Invitation
2003 – 20 Years on

2004 – 21st Birthday
2005 – The Face of Australia
2006 – Shine
2007 – My Spec
2008 – The Spectacular Spirit
2009 – Reaching Out
2010 – Colour My World
2011 – Imagine
2012 – Our Time
2013 – 30 Spectacular Years
2014 – This Is Australia

2015 – This is Our World
2016 – Dream Big
2017 – Own The Moment
2018 – The Greatest
2019 – Stars
2020 – Remixed (Broadcast Special)
2021 – Spectacular Schools Inspired (Broadcast Special)
2022 – Creating The Magic
2023 – Fabulous!

Notable alumni
 Human Nature (band, Australian recording artists)
 Nathan Foley (children's TV group Hi-5) 
 John Foreman (musician, Australian Idol musical director, Schools Spectacular host)
 Shannon Brown (The Ten Tenors)
 Paulini (Australian Idol finalist, Australian recording artist, Young Divas)
 Sabrina Batshon (Australian Idol finalist)
 Roshani Pridis (Australian Idol Finalist)
 Anja Nissen (The Voice 2014 Winner)
 Trevor Ashley (Musical Theatre performer)

References

External links 
Official Website

Australian music
Education in New South Wales
Student events
Recurring events established in 1993